Roberto Orlando Mosquera Vera (born 21 June 1956) is a Peruvian football manager and former player who played as a forward. He is the current manager of Bolivian club Royal Pari.

Mosquera played for the Peru national team in the 1978 FIFA World Cup.

Club career
Mosquera was forged in the minor divisions of Sporting Cristal, influenced by two relatives who played in the club: his father, Roberto Mosquera Sr. who played for Sporting Tobaco, and his uncle Max Mosquera, Cristal champion in 1956. He debuted in 1974 and played 3 games that year. Mosquera was consolidated as a starter the following years and was part of the powerful team that won the Bicampeonato in 1979 and 1980.
 
Then he migrated to Argentina where he played for Talleres de Córdoba. He later played for clubs in Colombia, Ecuador and Peru's Deportivo San Augustine, with whom he won the 1986 championship.

International career
Mosquera played for the Peruvian National Team in 16 games where scored 4 goals. He was also part of the team who participated in the World Cup 1978 and the Copa America 1979.

Managerial career
His first coaching experience was at Unión Huaral, leading the team in the 1995 regular season. The following year he joined Sporting Cristal where he managed a few games as interim coach. He was assistant to Sergio Markarian in the direction of Cristal for two years, winning the Campeonato Descentralizado in 1996 and finishing as runner-up in the 1997 Copa Libertadores.
 
The following years he led a series of provincial teams in Peru, said its passage by Coronel Bolognesi between 2002 and 2004 which were their best seasons in which they qualified for their first international cup competition. He has also managed teams in Bolivia since 2017, starting with Jorge Wilstermann from the city of Cochabamba and Royal Pari the following year.

Honours

Player
Sporting Cristal
Torneo Descentralizado: 1979, 1980

San Agustín
Torneo Descentralizado: 1986

Assistant Manager
Sporting Cristal
Torneo Descentralizado: 1996

Manager
Sporting Cristal
Peruvian Primera División: 2012, 2020
Copa Bicentenario: 2021
Torneo Apertura: 2021
Torneo Clausura runner-up: 2020

Juan Aurich 
Peruvian Primera División runner-up: 2014 
Torneo Apertura: 2014 

Deportivo Binacional
Peruvian Primera División: 2019

References

External links
 
 Roberto Mosquera at rsssf.com
 
 

1956 births
Living people
Footballers from Lima
Association football forwards
Peruvian footballers
Peru international footballers
Peruvian Primera División players
Categoría Primera A players
Sporting Cristal footballers
Talleres de Córdoba footballers
Deportivo Cali footballers
Once Caldas footballers
Cúcuta Deportivo footballers
S.D. Aucas footballers
1978 FIFA World Cup players
Peruvian expatriate footballers
Expatriate footballers in Argentina
Expatriate footballers in Colombia
Expatriate footballers in Ecuador
Peruvian expatriate sportspeople in Argentina
Peruvian expatriate sportspeople in Colombia
Peruvian football managers
Sporting Cristal managers
Coronel Bolognesi managers
FBC Melgar managers
Sport Boys managers
Deportivo Municipal managers
Juan Aurich managers
Club Alianza Lima managers
Peruvian Primera División managers
Deportivo Binacional FC managers
Royal Pari F.C. managers
Sport Áncash managers